The 2006–07 VfB Stuttgart season was 42nd season in the Bundesliga.

Team kit

Players

First-team squad
Squad at end of season

Left club during season

Reserve team

VfB Stuttgart II were coached by Rainer Adrion. They finished 3rd in the Regionalliga Süd.

Statistics

Appearances and goals

|-
! colspan=14 style=background:#dcdcdc; text-align:center| Goalkeepers

|-
! colspan=14 style=background:#dcdcdc; text-align:center| Defenders

|-
! colspan=14 style=background:#dcdcdc; text-align:center| Midfielders

|-
! colspan=14 style=background:#dcdcdc; text-align:center| Forwards

|}

Club
ManagementOther information

Bundesliga

Classification

Results

References

Notes

External links
 VfB Stuttgart official website

VfB Stuttgart seasons
Stuttgart
German football championship-winning seasons